= Jubin Mitra =

Indian musician

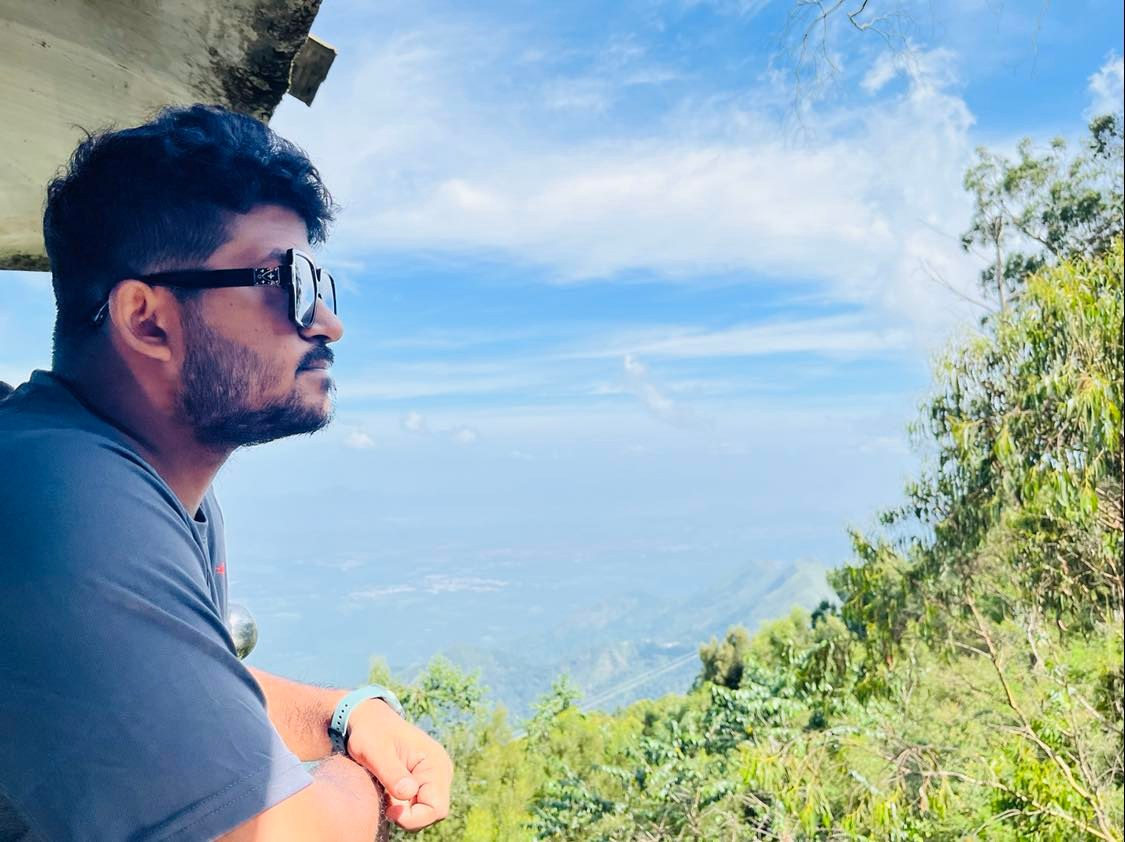
- Jubin Mitra

Background information
- Origin: Kolkata, West Bengal, India
- Genres: World
- Occupations: Singer; Lyricist; Music Composer

Jubin Mitra is an Indian singer, lyricist and music composer.

== Career ==
Mitra started his career with the documentary film Tribute to Akbar Ali Khan where he was a visual artist. In 2009 he joined Mamata Shankar Dance Academy and there he got a chance as a choreographer of a film named Friends. He then released his first song as a music composer with the song Divine Emotion.

== Music ==
- Divine Emotion
- Tum Mile
- Bolo Dugga Maiki
- Meghe Meghe Unplugged
- A Vein of Hope
- Ghum Aschena
- Tor Chokhe
- O Re Manush Re
- Ebar Tor Mora Gange
- Fule Fule Dhole Dhole
- Do Boondh
